The 2017 Group 10 Rugby League season was the 71st season of the premier competition of rugby league in the Central West area of New South Wales in 2017. It was run under the auspices of the Country Rugby League. It was the fifth consecutive season to feature nine teams, after the re-admittance of the Blayney Bears in 2013.

Mudgee Dragons entered the season as defending champions, after defeating Orange CYMS 14-10 in the 2016 premier league decider. Dragons made the final from fifth position, their win over minor premiers CYMS causing a massive upset.

Premier League season summary

Eighteen rounds were contested from April until August, resulting in the top of Orange CYMS, Bathurst Panthers, Oberon Tigers, Mudgee Dragons and Lithgow Workmen's Club.

Teams

Ladder

Finals 
The Group 10 Rugby League finals use the top five McIntyre system:

Grand Final

Orange CYMS 23 (Tom Satterthwaite 3, Robert Mortimer, Sam Hill tries; Benjamin McAlphine conversion, Michael Sullivan field goal)

Oberon Tigers 22 (Tui Oloapu, Tyler Hughes, Luke Branighan, Luke Carpenter, Jackson Brien tries; Branighan conversion)

References

External links
Group 10 ladder - from Sporting Pulse
Group 10 on Country Rugby League's official site

2017 in Australian rugby league
Rugby league competitions in New South Wales